Kalanchoe farinacea is a species of plant in the family Crassulaceae. It is endemic to the Yemeni island of Socotra. Its natural habitat is subtropical or tropical dry shrubland at an altitude of 100-800m. While it is listed by International Union for Conservation of Nature(IUCN) as belonging to the order Rosales, Kalanchoes and other Crassulaceae are more usually placed in Saxifragales.

References

farinacea
Endemic flora of Socotra
Least concern plants
Taxonomy articles created by Polbot
Taxa named by Isaac Bayley Balfour